The Coso Range Wilderness is a protected wilderness area in California in the northern end of the Coso Range.

The area was designated as wilderness by the California Desert Protection Act of 1994 and contains Joshua trees, creosote, and cactus as well as old mining areas.

The wilderness is bounded to the south and east by Naval Air Weapons Station China Lake.

References

Protected areas established in 1994
1994 establishments in California
Protected areas of Inyo County, California